"Chill Factor" is a song written and recorded by American country music artist Merle Haggard backed by The Strangers.  It was released in March 1988 as the second single and title track from the album Chill Factor.  The song reached number 9 on the Billboard Hot Country Singles & Tracks chart.

Chart performance

References

1988 singles
1988 songs
Merle Haggard songs
Songs written by Merle Haggard
Epic Records singles